William Julius Barker (June 25, 1886 – April 13, 1968), frequently known as W. J. Barker, was an American lawyer and United States district judge of the United States District Court for the Southern District of Florida.

Education and career

Born on June 25, 1886, in Marietta, Georgia, Barker attended the Fredric G. Levin College of Law at the University of Florida and received his Bachelor of Laws in 1916. Barker was in private practice in Jacksonville, Florida from 1916 to 1925, and was a circuit court judge in Highlands County, Florida from 1925 to 1940.

Federal judicial service

President Franklin D. Roosevelt nominated Barker to the United States District Court for the Southern District of Florida on January 11, 1940, to the seat vacated by Judge Alexander Akerman. Confirmed by the Senate on February 1, 1940, he received his commission on February 5, 1940. Barker served as Chief Judge from 1955 to 1959. He assumed senior status on April 30, 1959, and remained on the court until his death on April 13, 1968.

References

Sources
 

1886 births
1968 deaths
Judges of the United States District Court for the Southern District of Florida
United States district court judges appointed by Franklin D. Roosevelt
20th-century American judges
Fredric G. Levin College of Law alumni